Bella Starace Sainati (June 2, 1878 – August 4, 1958) was an Italian stage and film actress.

Selected filmography

 The Two Mothers (1938)
 Naples Will Never Die (1939)
 Goodbye Youth (1940)
 Inspector Vargas (1940)
 Saint John, the Beheaded (1940)
 The Sinner (1940)
 First Love (1941)
 The Secret Lover (1941)
 Carmela (1942)
 Jealousy (1942)
 Signorinette (1942)
 Odessa in Flames (1942)
 The Ten Commandments (1945)
 Farewell, My Beautiful Naples (1946)
 Bullet for Stefano (1947)
 Fury (1947)
 Vertigine d'amore (1949)
 Il voto (1950)
 His Last Twelve Hours (1951)
 Cameriera bella presenza offresi... (1951)
 The City Stands Trial (1952)
 What Price Innocence? (1952)

References

Bibliography
 Goble, Alan. The Complete Index to Literary Sources in Film. Walter de Gruyter, 1999.

External links

1878 births
1958 deaths
Italian stage actresses
Italian film actresses
19th-century Neapolitan people